Civil is a surname. Notable people with the surname include:

Alan Civil (1929–1989), British horn player
François Civil (born 1989), French actor
Gabrielle Civil, American performance artist
Karen Civil (born 1984), American social media and digital media marketing strategist
Leandro Civil (born 1948), Cuban middle-distance runner
Marta Civil, American mathematics educator
Miguel Civil (born 1926), American Assyriologist